The Fieldcrest Cannon Classic was a golf tournament on the LPGA Tour from 1995 to 1997. It was played at the Peninsula Country Club in the Charlotte, North Carolina suburb of Cornelius.

Winners
1997 Wendy Ward
1996 Trish Johnson
1995 Gail Graham

References

External links
Peninsula Country Club

Former LPGA Tour events
Golf in North Carolina
Sports competitions in Charlotte, North Carolina
Women's sports in North Carolina
1990s in North Carolina